The Trump Death Clock started as a website, and was later presented in billboard form in Times Square, displaying a claim to the number of deaths attributable to U.S. President Donald Trump's inaction during the COVID-19 pandemic in the United States. The clock was created by Eugene Jarecki. The billboard is on Broadway and West 43rd Street in Manhattan, New York City. The counter is based on the claim that had measures been implemented one week earlier, 60% of American COVID-19 deaths would have been avoided. On June 20, 2020, Eugene Jarecki drove a mobile version during the 2020 Trump Tulsa rally to ensure that Trump's supporters "[had] an opportunity to make an informed choice based on real numbers."

See also

National Debt Clock

References

External links

2020 works
Clocks in the United States
COVID-19 pandemic in New York City
Criticism of Donald Trump
Death in art
Death in New York City
Deaths from the COVID-19 pandemic in the United States
Impact of the COVID-19 pandemic on politics
Presidency of Donald Trump
Symbols of New York City
Times Square
Works about Donald Trump